Nuestra Belleza Chile is an annual beauty pageant in Chile. The winner of Nuestra Belleza Chile obtains the right to represent the country in the Miss Earth pageant, an annual international major beauty pageant that advocates for environmental awareness, conservation, and social responsibility.

The reigning titleholder is Romina Denecken van der Veen who competed in Miss Earth 2021 and finished as Miss Earth Water. That is the first time Chile was able to get an elemental title after Hil Hernandez' win in 2006.

History

2002-2011: Early years
Chile debut in Miss Earth in 2002. The official candidate in 2002-2005 was selected by Miss Chile pageant from the runner-up . Miss Earth Chile pageant was conducted in 2005 and the winner participated and won the Miss Earth 2006 pageant.  In 2010, Miss Model & Bellezas Chilenas organization appointed the titleholder for the competition.

2013-present: Nuestra Belleza Chile
In 2013, Carousel Productions awarded the franchise to Hernán Lucero & Eugenio Manzur for Miss Earth. Since then, the duo conducted regional pageants to advance in the national pageant that would be Chile's representative to Miss Earth. Their first Miss Earth Chile is Natalia Lermanda who was able to manage to be in the Top 16 semifinalist of Miss Earth 2013. That was the first time Chile was able to be in the semifinals after 7 years.

Titleholders
Color key

References

External links
Miss Earth official website

Beauty pageants in Chile
Recurring events established in 2010
Chilean awards